Altlengbach is a town in the district of Sankt Pölten-Land in the Austrian state of Lower Austria.

There are the following localities in the town:
Altlengbach, Audorf, Außerfurth, Gottleitsberg, Großenberg, Gschaid, Haagen, Hart, Hocheichberg, Höfer, Innerfurth, Kleinberg, Kogl, Leitsberg, Lengbachl, Linden, Maiß, Manzing, Nest, Öd, Ödengraben, Pamet, Schoderleh, Steinhäusl, Unterthurm

Population

References

Cities and towns in St. Pölten-Land District